George Coles may refer to:

 George Coles (Cambridge University cricketer) (1798–1865), English amateur cricketer
 George Coles (politician) (1810–1875), Canadian politician; first Premier of Prince Edward Island
 George Coles (Kent cricketer) (1851–1903), English cricketer
 George Coles (architect) (1884–1963), English architect
 George Coles (entrepreneur) (1885–1977), founder of what was to become the Coles Group shopping empire, Australia

See also
 George Cole (disambiguation)